Diamniadio is a town in Senegal.

History 
Diamniadio is a part of the collective development program of the government of Senegal under the leadership of President Macky Sall to revitalize Senegal's economy. The development of the new city is taking place around 30 km from Dakar, close to the Blaise Diagne International Airport, which opened in December 2017. The Diamniadio Lake City is one of its suburbs.

The idea behind the development is to ease the population pressure on Dakar. On completion, the new city will be connected to Dakar through a 32 km express highway, which will reduce the travel time from 90 minutes to an average of 30 minutes.

After visiting in November 2017, the minister in charge of the project, Cheikh Kanté, described the site as "80% completed". The first residential areas had been completed, as had several hotels initially serving the new airport. Manufacturing areas, the Amadou-Mahtar-Mbow University, and the planned railway station, part of the Train Express Regional, are facing delays.

Population 
According to the official estimates of 2007, the population of Diamniadio was 12,326. Upon completion of the Diamniadio Lake City, the government is expecting that around 300,000 of the population will move to the new city.

Transport 
The new city is connected to Dakar by a 32 km toll highway, which initially reduced travel time from 90 minutes to 15–30.

Diamniadio is also connected to Dakar by a new railway line, the Train Express Regional, which ran its first train in December 2021 and is a part of the link between Dakar and Blaise Diagne International Airport.

References 

Populated places in Dakar Region
Communes of Senegal
Planned cities